Hamish McLachlan (27 July 1967 – 21 December 2020) was an Australian rower. He competed in the men's eight event at the 1988 Summer Olympics, finishing fifth. In 2004, McLachlan was jailed for nine years for stock market fraud.

McLachlan died on 21 December 2020.

References

External links
 

1967 births
2020 deaths
Australian male rowers
Olympic rowers of Australia
Rowers at the 1988 Summer Olympics
Place of birth missing
Australian fraudsters
Australian prisoners and detainees
Prisoners and detainees of Australia
20th-century Australian people